, also known as Mahō, is a Japanese entertainment company.

History
Established in Kobe in 1983 to design and develop video games, the company was incorporated on May 29, 1985 as Home Data. During the 80's they developed and published various mahjong games for the Arcades.

They developed Last Apostle Puppet Show (known in Japan as Reikai Dōshi: Chinese Exorcist), released in September 1988. It was the first fighting game to use digitized sprites and motion capture animation, and was the first claymation fighting game. They also created Battlecry among many other titles for different console systems.

In 1993, in order to mark the tenth anniversary of Home Data's establishment, the company's name was changed to Magical Company. They ported three Garou Densetsu titles for the X68000, and are also well known in Japan for having published many Shogi titles.

The baseball series Kōshien is their most notable franchise.

Video games

Home Data
Penguin-Kun Wars, Family Computer (1985)
Sky Destroyer, Family Computer (1985)
Sqoon, Family Computer (1986)
Tetsuwan Atom, Family Computer (1988)
Reikai Doushi: Chinese Exorcist (Last Apostle Puppet Show), Arcade (1988)
BattleCry, Arcade (1989)
Hayauchi Super Igo, Family Computer (1989)
Cosmic Epsilon, Family Computer (1989)
World Super Tennis, Family Computer/NES (1989)
Shogi Shodan Icchokusen, PC Engine (1990)
Marble Madness, X68000 (1991)
2069 A.D., X68000 (1991)
Mahjong Clinic Zoukangou, X68000 (1991)
Mahjong Yuuenchi, X68000 (1991)
Little League Baseball: Championship Series
Famicom Shogi: Ryuu-Ou-Sen, Family Computer (1991)
Tetra Star: The Fighter, Family Computer (1991)
Shogi no Hoshi, Mega Drive (1991)
Dragon's Eye Plus: Shanghai 3 (Shanghai II: Dragon's Eye), Mega Drive/Genesis (1991/1994)
Shogi Shoshinsha Muyou, PC Engine (1991)
Famicom Igo Nyuumon, Family Computer (1991)
Shogi Seiten, X68000 (1992)
Hermetica, Arcade (unreleased)

Magical Company
Garou Densetsu, X68000 (1993)
Garou Densetsu 2: Aratanaru Tatakai, X68000 (1993)
Garou Densetsu Special, X68000 (1994)
Shogi Saikyō, Game Boy (1994), Super Famicom (1995)
Harapeko Bakka (known in Europe as Hungry Dinosaurs), Super Famicom (1994)
Nice de Shot, Super Famicom (1994)
Pachi-Slot Kenkyū, Super Famicom (1994)
Tsume Shogi: Kanki Godan, Game Boy (1994)
Tsume Go Series 1: Fujisawa Hideyuki Meiyo Kisei, Game Boy (1994)
Zenkoku Kōkō Soccer Senshuken '96, Super Famicom (1996)
Shogi Saikyō II: Jissen Taikyoku Hen, Super Famicom (1996)
Hanabi Fantast, PlayStation (1998)
Shogi Saikyou 2, PlayStation (1998)
Qui Qui, Game Boy Color (1999)
Shogi Saikyō: Pro ni Manabu, PlayStation (1999)
Pet Pet Pet, PlayStation (1999)
Killer Bass, PlayStation (2000)
Omiai Commando: Bakappuru ni Tukkomi o, PlayStation (2000)
Ooedo Huusui Ingaritsu Hanabi 2, PlayStation (2000)
Magical Sports Go Go Golf, PlayStation 2 (2000)
Hard Hitter Tennis, PlayStation 2 (2001)
Magical Sports: Hard Hitter 2, PlayStation 2 (2002)
Hanabi Shokunin Ninarou 2, PlayStation 2 (2003)
Kōshien (series), various consoles

See also
List of fighting game companies
List of shogi video games

References

External links
 
Magical Company Ltd. at MobyGames
History of Magical Company Ltd. at MobyGames
List of Home Data games at GameFAQs
List of Magical Company games at GameFAQs
Home Data/Magical Company at GDRI

Entertainment companies of Japan
Companies based in Kobe
Video game companies established in 1985
Mass media companies of Japan
Video game companies of Japan
Video game development companies
Video game publishers
Mass media in Kobe